Manitoba Provincial Road 348 is a provincial road in the southwestern section of the Canadian province of Manitoba.

348